Banca Popolare di Venezia was an Italian cooperative bank which was acquired in 1994 by the Banca Popolare di Vicenza.

References

Defunct cooperative banks of Italy